Marcelo Carlo Broli Gorgoroso (born 13 March 1978) is a Uruguayan professional football manager and former player who played as a defensive midfielder. He is the current manager of the Uruguay national under-20 team and the interim manager of the Uruguay national team.

Playing career
In the 2005–2006 season, Broli, along with his countrymen Fernando Correa, Oscar Javier Morales and Jorge Winston Curbelo, were signed by Valladolid.

Coaching career
In October 2016, Broli was appointed assistant coach under Marcelo Méndez at Progreso. The duo left the club on 7 November 2018. From 1 January 2019, the duo took charge over Danubio. They were fired in September 2019.

One year after leaving Danubio, Broli got his first job as a head coach, when he was presented as the new coach of Villa Teresa on 8 September 2019. He left the position at the end of 2020.

On 27 January 2021, Broli took charge of Peñarol's U19 team.

On 28 February 2023, Broli was appointed as the caretaker manager of the Uruguay national team for friendly matches against Japan and South Korea.

Honours

Manager
Peñarol U20
U-20 Copa Libertadores: 2022
U-20 Sudamericano 2023 (segundo lugar)

References

External links

1978 births
Living people
Uruguayan footballers
Uruguayan expatriate footballers
Uruguay international footballers
Uruguayan people of Italian descent
Citizens of Italy through descent
Association football midfielders
Uruguayan emigrants to Italy
Footballers from Montevideo
Huracán Buceo players
Audax Italiano footballers
Peñarol players
Centro Atlético Fénix players
Club Nacional de Football players
Montevideo Wanderers F.C. players
Rampla Juniors players
Juventud de Las Piedras players
Miramar Misiones players
Segunda División players
Real Valladolid players
Uruguayan expatriate sportspeople in Spain
Uruguayan expatriate sportspeople in Chile
Expatriate footballers in Spain
Expatriate footballers in Chile
Uruguayan football managers